Céline Distel-Bonnet (born 25 May 1987) is a French former athlete who competed in the sprinting events.

She finished sixth in the 100 metres at the 2014 European Championships.

In addition, she won several medals as part of the French 4 × 100 metres relay.

She competed for France at the 2016 Summer Olympics.

Competition record

Personal bests
Outdoor
100 metres – 11.24 (+1.5 m/s) (Reims 2014)
200 metres – 23.30 (+1.2 m/s) (Paris 2013)
Indoor
60 metres – 7.31 (Aubière 2013)

Notes

References

External links 
 
 
 

1987 births
Living people
Sportspeople from Strasbourg
French female sprinters
European Athletics Championships medalists
World Athletics Championships athletes for France
Athletes (track and field) at the 2016 Summer Olympics
Olympic athletes of France
Olympic female sprinters
21st-century French women